Madonna and Child with Three Saints or Adoration of the Christ Child with Saints is a c.1519 oil on canvas painting by Titian, now in the Alte Pinakothek in Munich.. From left to right the adoring saints are Francis of Assisi, Jerome and Anthony Abbot.

Carlo Ridolfi praised the work after seeing it in the collection of paintings Jacopo Casciopino brought to Antwerp in the 17th century. Previously misattributed to Titian's elder brother Francesco Vecellio or Titian's studio, it was reidentified as an autograph work by Titian himself in 1951, though its owner's online catalogue retains the traditional attribution to Francesco Veccellio. It is dated via its stylistic similarities to the Gozzi Altarpiece.

References

Paintings of the Madonna and Child by Titian
Paintings of Francis of Assisi
Paintings of Anthony the Great
Paintings of Jerome
1519 paintings
Collection of the Alte Pinakothek